Bnehran is a Shia Muslim village in Koura District of Lebanon. It has 50 households and 566 residents.

References

   

Populated places in the North Governorate
Koura District
Shia Muslim communities in Lebanon